Crowing Pains is a 1947 Warner Bros. Looney Tunes cartoon directed by Robert McKimson. The cartoon was released on July 12, 1947, and stars Henery Hawk, Sylvester, Foghorn Leghorn and the Barnyard Dawg. This is McKimson's first short to feature Sylvester.

Plot
Sylvester is sneaking to the doghouse in a bush. He tries to steal the bone, but the Barnyard Dawg grabs the paw and looks inside the bush to see Sylvester with a flower in his mouth and several more flowers on his head.

After Sylvester deliberately whacks Barnyard Dawg on the head with his dog food dish, Barnyard Dawg gives chase and chases Sylvester on the wall and jumps over a branch, only to get caught by the leash and hangs from the branch by the leash. Sylvester is about to cut the leash with an axe, but Foghorn grabs the blade and Sylvester whacks too hard and vibrates as he goes by the fire wood, and the branch breaks and Barnyard Dawg gets hit on the head and walks off.
When Foghorn is telling Sylvester "Let's bury the hat- I say- let's bury the hatchet, but not in anyone's head, boy!" while Sylvester is trying to speak, Sylvester angrily yells "Ah, SHADDAP!" and whacks Foghorn on the head with the bladeless axe and leaves as Foghorn sees stars and still holds the blade. Henery Hawk sees Foghorn, and believing he is a chicken, grabs him by the toe and begins pulling him away. Foghorn regains his senses and asks Henery where he is taking him. After Henery tells Foghorn that he is a chicken, Foghorn convinces Henery that Sylvester is a chicken. Foghorn sticks Henery in a fake egg, tells Henery "Open the window, Richard, that's what it's there for," and places it under Sylvester. Sylvester wakes up, thinking he's laid the egg and has become a mother, sings "Rock A Bye Baby" to it then hides the egg when he sees Foghorn coming and Foghorn congratulates Sylvester for laying the egg, only Sylvester realizes that cats can't lay eggs ("Hey, tom cats can't be mothers! Cats don't lay eggs! There's something screwy here!) and Sylvester attempts to detach himself from this egg that suddenly follows him and attaches itself to him and that literally scares Sylvester out of his wits when he thinks the egg is possessed by a ghost. He runs from it and literally does all sorts of things including running into the dog house belonging to the Barnyard Dawg.  The dog pulls the cat out and stomps all over him and walks off. Henery, still in the egg, runs into the dog, which causes the dog to trip and fall over. The dog looks at the egg and then at the camera and says to the audience: "I just takes a step, and PRESTO! I lays an egg!". The scene fades to a mother duck, with her ducklings, who says to herself "Presto, and he lays an egg. And to think for fifteen years I've been doing it the hard way". The egg/Henery finally discovers Sylvester's hiding spot (a barrel), and he starts to burrow himself into Sylvester's skin, presumably for "mock incubation" reasons.

Reaching a breaking point, Sylvester comes close to literally smashing the egg with a mallet. Just as the egg is about to be smashed, Henery busts out of the egg and yells "STOP!" to which Sylvester, in a classic "wild take" scene, literally yanks his head up and down by his ears and grabs his tail and literally yanks on it, causing his head to literally pop up and down on his shoulders because Sylvester thinks he's crazy. Henery, seeing enough, clobbers Sylvester with a mallet and drags him off. Sylvester wakes up and asks "Say, what's the big idea?!" and Henery warns the "chicken" to not give him any trouble and Sylvester realizes that he's been part of a trick and he leaps up and shows Henery that the actual chicken, is Foghorn himself. Foghorn replies, insulted by the accusation, "If I'm a roost- I say -if I'm a rooster, I hope to be struck by--" but gets interrupted when he almost literally gets struck by lightning, and decides to "put it another way. Way, that is," and an argument arises between Sylvester, Foghorn, and Barnyard Dawg as they accuse each other of misleading Henery Hawk.

Finally, Henery decides the only way to settle the matter is to see who crows at dawn, and they all agree to do so. At dawn, Sylvester appears to be crowing, which leads to Henery dragging Sylvester away. However, it turns out that Foghorn was crowing, and he shows a book on ventriloquism. Foghorn tells the audience "You gotta- I say -you gotta keep on your toes. Toes, that is!" just before the cartoon irises out.

Voice cast
Mel Blanc as Henery Hawk / Sylvester / Foghorn Leghorn
Robert C. Bruce as Barnyard Dawg

Home media
VHS - Cartoon Moviestars, Tweety & Sylvester
VHS (Swe) - Sylwester och andra smarta katter (Ayamonte AB)
Laserdisc - The Golden Age of Looney Tunes, Vol. 2, Side 9: Best Supporting Players
DVD - Looney Tunes Golden Collection: Volume 6, Disc 1 (original opening and credits restored)
Streaming - HBO Max

References

External links

 

1947 films
1947 short films
1947 comedy films
1947 animated films
1940s Warner Bros. animated short films
Looney Tunes shorts
1940s English-language films
Sylvester the Cat films
Foghorn Leghorn films
Barnyard Dawg films
Henery Hawk films
Films set on farms
Films directed by Robert McKimson
Films scored by Carl Stalling